Homalactia is a genus of bristle flies in the family Tachinidae. There is at least one described species in Homalactia, H. harringtoni.

References

Further reading

External links

 

Tachininae